Louis Clark Brock Jr. (born May 8, 1964) is an American former professional football player who was a cornerback and safety in the National Football League (NFL).

Professional career
Brock played for the San Diego Chargers, Detroit Lions and Seattle Seahawks in his brief career.

He later worked as an executive with the Sprint/Nextel Corporation.

College career
Brock attended the University of Southern California where he played collegiate baseball, and football.

Personal life
He is  the son of Hall of Fame baseball player Lou Brock.

1964 births
Living people
Players of American football from Chicago
American football cornerbacks
American football safeties
Detroit Lions players
San Diego Chargers players
Seattle Seahawks players
USC Trojans football players
University of Southern California alumni